The Chinese Elm cultivar Ulmus parvifolia 'Garden City Clone' was raised in Kansas. The champion tree was 18 m tall in 1993; however, the name 'Garden City Clone' is not officially recognized.

Description
Not available.

Cultivation
Laboratory tests at Kansas State University found the tree was hardy down to a temperature of -30°C (−22°F). The cultivar is not known to have been introduced to Europe or Australasia.

Pests and diseases
The species and its cultivars are highly resistant, but not immune, to Dutch elm disease, and unaffected by the Elm Leaf Beetle Xanthogaleruca luteola.

Synonymy
'Garden City'

Accessions

North America

Dawes Arboretum , Newark, Ohio, US. 1 tree, no acc. details available.
Morton Arboretum, US. Acc. no. 173-2004, as Ulmus 'Garden City'.

Europe
Grange Farm Arboretum, Lincolnshire, UK. Acc. no. 1272, as Ulmus 'Garden City'.

References

External links
https://web.archive.org/web/20070222232826/http://redwood.mortonarb.org/PageBuilder?cid=2&qid= Morton Arboretum Catalogue 2006

Chinese elm cultivar
Ulmus articles missing images
Ulmus